State Road 87 (SR 87; sometimes called the Navarre Beach Expressway) is a  north–south highway in the state of Florida that extends from U.S. Route 98 (US 98) to the Alabama state line where it becomes State Route 41.  All of SR 87 is contained within Santa Rosa County.

Route description

State Road 87 contains a 19.4-mile (31.2 km) section extending northward from US 98 at Navarre, Florida to US 90 just east of Milton, Florida.  This portion of SR 87 is marked as SR 87 South.  On this stretch it passes through the western edge of the Eglin Air Force Base training range. After having an interchange with Interstate 10 (I-10) at exit 31, it shares a 4.6-mile (7.4 km) east–west section of US 90 until it reaches Milton where it turns north onto Stewart Street, and runs for another 30.4-mile (48.9 km) section from Milton, Florida northward to the Alabama state line, where it continues towards Brewton as Alabama State Route 41. This portion of SR 87 is marked as SR 87 North.  While within Milton city limits it becomes a divided highway between Ridge Crest Drive and Mitchell Cemetery near Whiting Field in Point Baker.

Major intersections

County Road 87A

County Road 87A is one of three suffixed alternate county roads of SR 87, according to the Florida Department of Transportation. The first of which is in Milton beginning at the west end of the concurrency of US 90/SR 87 and CR 191. The road begins as Canal Street between US 90/SR 87 and Berryhill Road. The route then runs west along Berryhill road for one block until it turns north again at Alabama Street. CR 87A crosses Munson Highway (a leg of CR 191), and then the Blackwater Heritage State Rail Trail until it curves west onto North Avenue and ends at SR 87.

The second CR 87A is in Point Baker, north of the north end of the SR 89 overlap. It runs east from SR 87 as Langley Street into Whiting Field Naval Air Station, which bisects the road. The other end of CR 87A runs south from Whiting Field as East Gate Road and ends at CR 191 (Munson Highway) across from the intersection of Roeville Road.

The third CR 87A is Market Road near Berrydale, which runs east and west from State Road 4 to SR 87, far north of the northwest corner of the intersection of SRs 87 and 4.

References

External links

Florida Route Log (SR 87)
FDOT Map of Santa Rosa County (Including SR 87)

087
087